Aralia dasyphylloides is a species of flowering plant in the family Araliaceae, native to south China. Some sources have included it in Aralia dasyphylla.

References

dasyphylloides
Flora of China